Rhain was an 11th-century king of Dyfed.

It is unclear when his reign began. He claimed to be the son of Maredudd ab Owain and was apparently accepted as such by the people of Dyfed and the anonymous author of the C text of the Annals of Wales. However, after his defeat at Abergwill and deposition by Llywelyn ap Seisyll of Gwynedd in 1022, he was recorded by the other histories of the time as Rhain the Irishman (Welsh ) and treated as a pretender. The B text of the Welsh annals asserted he was killed in the battle with Llywelyn; the Chronicle of the Princes, however, pointedly notes that his body was not discovered.

References

House of Dinefwr
Monarchs of Deheubarth
Monarchs of Dyfed
11th-century Welsh monarchs